St. Joan of Arc Catholic Secondary School is a school administered by the Dufferin-Peel Catholic District School Board, located in the Churchill Meadows neighbourhood of Mississauga, Ontario, Canada (Wards 8 and 10).  Churchill Meadows Branch of the Mississauga Library System is attached to the school, which shares its facilities.

School History 
St. Joan of Arc Catholic Secondary School opened its doors on an off-site location to 134 Grade 9 Students from Churchill Meadows community on September 7, 2004. Clara Pitoscia was the founding Principal and with a staff of twelve teachers, the Chaplaincy leader, and three secretaries the school community began to establish its foundation. St. Joan of Arc was the third high school in Mississauga to be built in partnership with the City of Mississauga sharing a public library facility and community area. In January 2007, two and half years after the school was founded, the students and staff moved into the permanent site at 3801 Thomas Street.

Feeder Schools
 St. Bernard of Clairvaux Catholic Elementary School
 St. Faustina Catholic Elementary School
 St. Sebastian Catholic Elementary School

Notable alumni
 Josh Naylor, first baseman and outfielder in the MLB's Cleveland Indians organization (Class of 2015)
 Bo Naylor, drafted by the MLB's Cleveland Indians in the 2018 MLB Draft (Class of 2018)
 Ethan Small, first Canadian to win a gold medal at a Jr WKF World Karate Championships in a mainstream division

See also 
List of high schools in Ontario
Churchill Meadows

Controversy 

 A small group of staff members at a high school in Mississauga briefly refused to work on Tuesday, September 8, 2020, saying they were initially provided masks that did not meet Health Canada standards.

References

High schools in Mississauga
Catholic secondary schools in Ontario
Educational institutions established in 2004
2004 establishments in Ontario